Allan Pennington Burns (May 18, 1935January 30, 2021) was an American screenwriter and television producer. He was best known for co-creating and writing for the television sitcoms The Munsters and The Mary Tyler Moore Show.

Early life
Burns was born in Baltimore on May 18, 1935. His father died when he was nine years old. Three years later, he moved to Honolulu with his mother after his older brother was assigned to Naval Station Pearl Harbor. He attended Punahou School and illustrated a cartoon that featured several times a week in the Honolulu Star-Bulletin. He studied architecture at the University of Oregon starting in 1953, after being awarded a partial scholarship. However, he dropped out two years later and moved to Los Angeles, where he secured a job as a page for NBC.

Career
Before breaking into television and film, he started in animation, working for Jay Ward and collaborating on and animating The Rocky and Bullwinkle Show, Dudley Do-Right, and George of the Jungle. Burns also created the Cap'n Crunch character for Quaker Oats.

After his stint writing for Jay Ward, Burns formed a partnership with Chris Hayward. They created the series The Munsters (1964) and My Mother the Car (1965), and were later hired by producer Leonard Stern as story editors for the CBS series He & She, for which they won an Emmy award for comedy writing. The last project between Hayward and Burns would be as story editors for the sitcom Get Smart. During this time, Burns also co-wrote the unaired version of the 1965 pilot episode of The Smothers Brothers Show.

Burns first met James L. Brooks in 1965, getting him a writing job on his show My Mother The Car. After being impressed with the television pilot for Brooks's show Room 222, Burns began a partnership with Brooks and joined the Room 222 writing staff and later produced the series.

After Room 222, television executive Grant Tinker hired Brooks and Burns to develop a television series for CBS starring Mary Tyler Moore. In 1970, The Mary Tyler Moore Show premiered and became a critically acclaimed series, spawning spin-off series such as Lou Grant and Rhoda. Brooks and Burns also created the 1974 situation comedy Paul Sand in Friends and Lovers. Burns also worked as a writer and producer on the shows FM, The Duck Factory, Eisenhower and Lutz, and Cutters.

Burns also worked in film, co-writing the film A Little Romance (1979), for which he was nominated for an Academy Award for Best Adapted Screenplay. He also wrote the screenplays Butch and Sundance: The Early Days, Just the Way You Are and wrote and directed Just Between Friends.

Personal life
Burns married Joan Bailey in 1964; the couple had two children: Eric and Matthew.

Burns died at his home in Los Angeles on January 30, 2021, aged 85, from Parkinson's disease and Lewy body dementia.

Awards

Primetime Emmy Awards

References

Note

External links

 

1935 births
2021 deaths
20th-century American male writers
20th-century American screenwriters
American television producers
American television writers
Deaths from Lewy body dementia
Deaths from Parkinson's disease
Film directors from Hawaii
Film directors from Maryland
Deaths from dementia in California
Primetime Emmy Award winners
Screenwriters from Hawaii
Screenwriters from Maryland
University of Oregon alumni
Writers from Baltimore
Writers from Honolulu